Råde Idrettslag is a Norwegian sports club from Råde, Østfold. It has sections for association football, race walking, team handball, floorball, tennis, volleyball, speed skating and skiing.

History
The club was founded on 29 March 1929 as Råde SK. It changed its name to Råde IL on 1 March 1946. It formerly had sections for badminton, basketball, gymnastics, track and field and orienteering.

The men's football team currently plays in the Fifth Division, the sixth tier of Norwegian football. It last played in the Norwegian Second Division in 1999. Former players include Øystein Drillestad, Leif Andersen, Bjørnar Johannessen, Jon André Fredriksen and Vidar Martinsen. Kai Erik Herlovsen has coached the team.

References

 Official site 

Football clubs in Norway
Sport in Østfold
Association football clubs established in 1929
Defunct athletics clubs in Norway
1929 establishments in Norway